Big Brother Mzansi: Beke Le Beke (also known as Big Brother Mzansi 3 or Big Brother South Africa 5) is the third season of the South African Big Brother reality television reboot series produced by Banijay and Red Pepper Pictures for Mzansi Magic. It returned after a six-year hiatus and marked 20 years since the Big Brother brand launched in South Africa.

The show premiered on 23 January 2022 on Mzansi Magic and DStv with 18 contestants initially and a new host, Lawrence Maleka. A week later, two more contestants were introduced to the house.

On 3 April, Mphowabadimo was declared the winner of the third season of Big Brother Mzansi and received R2 million, while Gash1 was the runner-up.

Housemates 
The first evening (23 January) introduced 18 housemates, equally split between male and female. After only three days in the house, QV decided to withdraw from the competition for mental health reasons. On 30 January, instead of an eviction, Vyno and Nthabii were added to the house.

Nomination History 

 In week 1, all housemates made their eviction nominations. On eviction night, it was revealed that all housemates were actually up for eviction, before the eviction for that week was cancelled.
 In week 2 and 3, only the HoH and deputy HoH were allowed to nominate housemates for possible eviction. The HoH had to use their veto power to replace one housemate from those nominated by the deputy HoH, with a non-nominated housemate.
 In week 3, under Sis Tamara and Yoli's leadership, the housemates won their first 100% wager.
 For the third week in a row, only the HoH and deputy HoH were allowed to nominate, with HoH once again having the privilege to save and replace.
 Week 5 was the first week that all housemates had the opportunity to nominate other housemates for possible eviction. Both the HoH and deputy HoH were immune from nomination while the HoH had to perform a save and replace in front of all the housemates. 
 The Conspiracy Corner was introduced, where housemates could discuss who they want to nominate.
 In week 8, instead of nominations, the Ultimate Veto Power Games were played, where the winning housemate and two other housemates of their choosing would be guaranteed a spot in the finale. The Conspiracy Corner was also removed.
 In week 9, all housemates except for the Ultimate Veto Power Holder and two housemates of their choosing were up for eviction.

Nominations: Results

References

External links 
 

South Africa
2022 South African television seasons